Italiana is a double album by Italian singer Mina, published in 1982.

Like Mina's other material, this album came out as a double LP on first release. Thereafter the record was available as two separate albums with the titles of "Vol. 1" "vol. 2", while maintaining the same track list of the two original discs and the same cover.

"Sweet Transvestite" is a cover of a song from the soundtrack of The Rocky Horror Picture Show.

"Marrakesh" is the Italian version of the 1975 song "Qualquer coisa" by Caetano Veloso.

The songs "Il Cigno Dell'Amore" and "Senza Fiato" were covered by Ajda Pekkan, the famous Turkish singer, (respectively as "Son Yolcu" ("Last Passenger" in Turkish) and "Düşünme Hiç" ("You Don't Think Never" in Turkish) on "Süperstar 83", released in 1983.

Track listing

Vol. 1 

 Magica follia – 3:59 (Andrea Lo Vecchio)
 Il cigno dell'amore – 4:26 (Anselmo Genovese)
 Perfetto non so – 4:03 (lyrics: Andrea Lo Vecchio – music: Celso Valli)
 Per averti qui – 4:40 (Massimiliano Pani, Celso Valli)
 Ti dimentichi di Maria – 3:38 (lyrics: Massimiliano Pani – music: Celso Valli)
 Già visto – 5:16 (lyrics: Massimiliano Pani – music: Celso Valli)
 Morirò per te – 4:24 (lyrics: Giancarlo Bigazzi – music: Maurizio Piccoli)
 O Qué Será (O Que Será (À Flor Da Pele)) (feat. Celso Valli) – 5:28 (Chico Buarque de Hollanda, Luis Gomez Escolar)
 Sapori di civiltà – 4:58 (Valentino Alfano, Massimiliano Pani)

Vol. 2 

 Mi piace tanto la gente – 5:37 (lyrics: Carla Vistarini – music: Nat Kipner, Luigi Lopez)
 Sweet Transvestite (feat. John H. Adams) – 4:33 (Richard O'Brien)
 Senza fiato – 4:08 (lyrics: Anselmo Genovese, Osvaldo Miccike – music: Anselmo Genovese)
 La vita vuota – 3:47 (lyrics: Lucio Tunesi – music: Cesare Rotondo)
 Marrakesh (Qualquer coisa) – 3:12 (lyrics: Caetano Veloso, Cristiano Malgioglio – music: Caetano Veloso)
 It's Your Move – 5:15 (lyrics: Nat Kipner – music: Luigi Lopez)
 Musica d'Argentina – 4:40 (lyrics: Andrea Lo Vecchio – music: Celso Valli)
 Caro qualcuno – 5:10 (lyrics: Sergio Bardotti – music: Umberto Bindi)
 Oggi è nero – 5:12 (Valentino Alfano, Massimiliano Pani)

References

1982 albums
Mina (Italian singer) albums